Port of Pärnu is a port in Pärnu, Estonia. The port is located on both side of Pärnu River.

The first mention of the port dates back in 13th century. The flourishing of port started at the end of 18th century and at the beginning of 19th century. The main exports of the port being timber and flax.

In modern times, the port has regular cruises between Kihnu and Ruhnu.

Mole of Pärnu
To protect the port area, the Mole of Pärnu (Pärnu Breakwaters) was built. The total length of two breakwaters is 5 km. The breakwaters were built in 1863–1864.

References

External links
 

Ports and harbours of Estonia
Buildings and structures in Pärnu